Talia Lavin (born 1989) is an American journalist. She is the author of Culture Warlords: My Journey into the Dark Web of White Supremacy, published in 2020.

Life 
Lavin grew up in Teaneck, New Jersey and was raised Modern Orthodox. She attended SAR High School and graduated from Harvard University in 2012 with a degree in comparative literature. She was a Fulbright scholar and spent a year in Ukraine from 2012 to 2013.

Lavin is Jewish.

Career 
Lavin was a fact-checker at the New Yorker. She resigned from her position in 2018 after mistakenly comparing a U.S. Immigration and Customs Enforcement (ICE) officer's tattoo to an Iron Cross. ICE released a statement via Twitter that the officer's tattoo is a Titan 2 platoon symbol, accompanied by the Spartan Creed. Lavin had deleted the original tweet before the agency's statement. In 2018, she was hired as researcher on far-right extremism by Media Matters for America.

Until January 2019 Lavin wrote a weekly political column in HuffPost, and she also worked as a columnist for MSNBC Daily. Her work appeared in GQ, Jewcy, HuffPost, Rolling Stone, The New Republic, The New Yorker, New York magazine, The Nation, and The Washington Post.

Bibliography

Books

Essays and reporting

Critical studies and reviews of Lavin's work
Culture warlords

References

External links 

 Kelly Hayes, Fascism Has Gone Mainstream, truthout, September 9, 2022

American journalists
The New Yorker people
Harvard University alumni
Living people
Transgender writers
Transgender men
Year of birth missing (living people)